The J.72 was an ultra-exclusive luxury roadster, the first production vehicle of the Panther Westwinds company. Styled to evoke the Jaguar SS100 and sold from 1972 through 1981, it used mechanicals from the Jaguar XJ, including its 5.3 L V12 engine.  It was also offered with Jaguar's 3.8 L and 4.2 L XK engines.

The J.72 was a success for the small company, with its Connolly coachwork. The car was purchased by a celebrity clientele. A total of 368 units were produced.

A custom made J72 was ordered to be made using a V-12 engine. In 1973 it was shown at The Frankfurt Motor Show , it was a popular and became a regular upgrade option for an extra £4,000.

On the 26 May 1976, Robert Jankel wrote to the Office of Compliance, National Highway Traffic Safety Administration, Washington, D.C. 20591, U.S.A. to comply with Part 578 of the Defect Report procedure. Six vehicles had a defect with the fuel tank, in the event of a crash the fuel tank was at risk of being pierced by the rear body mounting bolts. If this happened fuel would spill out and could cause a fire. Panther Westwinds Ltd notified the dealers and the first purchasers of the defect and told them what modifications needed to be done to fix the problem.

Sources and further reading

J72
Retro-style automobiles
Roadsters
Luxury vehicles
Cars introduced in 1972
1980s cars